The 2007–08 Coupe de France was the 91st edition of the prestigious tournament and is open to all clubs in French football, as well as the 4 overseas departments if they qualify. The defending champions were FC Sochaux-Montbéliard who defeated Olympique Marseille 5-4 on penalties to claim their 2nd Coupe de France trophy. The final was held on May 24, 2008 at the Stade de France. The 2008 Coupe de France champions are Olympique Lyonnais, who defeated Paris Saint-Germain 1-0 to claim their 4th Coupe de France trophy.

Note: Cup results officially began at the start of the 7th Round, as it is the official starting position of most professional clubs.

Seventh Round
Matches played on November 24, 2007

Matches played on November 25, 2007

Eighth Round
Match was played on December 14, 2007

Matches were played on December 15, 2007

Matches were played on December 16, 2007

Round of 64
Match was played on January 4, 2008

Matches were played on January 5, 2008

Matches were played on January 6, 2008..

Round of 32Matches were played on February 1, 2008Matches were played on February 2, 2008Matches were played on February 3, 2008Round of 16Matches were played on March 18, 2008Matches were played on March 19, 2008''

Quarter-finals

Semi-finals

Final

Topscorer
Karim Benzema (6 goals)

References
Official page on FFF site
Coupe de France page on LFP site
Coupe de France Results

External links

Ligue 1 2007-08
Ligue 2 2007-08
Championnat National 2007-08
Championnat de France Amateurs
Championnat de France Amateurs 2

 
Coupe
Coupe de France seasons